The Arthur Laing Bridge  is a crossing over the north arm of the Fraser River, and several minor roads, in Metro Vancouver.

History

Proposal
The closing of the original Marpole Bridge in 1957 created a more circuitous route between Vancouver and Vancouver International Airport (YVR). Years of debate to restore a direct route followed. In 1963, Arthur Laing, Minister of Northern Affairs and National Resources, announced plans for a toll bridge to be completed within three years. By 1965, he was promoting a tunnel. In 1971, Don Jamieson, Minister of Transport announced a toll-free bridge, but the proposed ramps directly accessing bridges to Lulu Island would not be built. Richmond residents were angry.

On September 6, 1974, Pierre Trudeau announced that the new bridge over the north arm of the Fraser River would be named after Arthur Laing, who was a member of House of Commons of Canada from Vancouver.

Completion and controversy
Although the bridge opened to traffic on 27 August 1975, Otto Lang, Minister of Transport, performed the official opening of the $23m crossing in May 1976. On hand were Premier Bill Bennett, Gil Blair, mayor of Richmond, Art Phillips, mayor of Vancouver, and widow Geraldine Laing, who unveiled a plaque.

The main span comprises haunched (deeper at supports) steel box-girders and the approaches are concrete box-girders. YVR owns and maintains this high-level four-lane crossing, that has no sidewalks, and cyclists ride on the shoulders of the roadway. Being federal property, signage is in both official languages.

Claiming concerns over increased congestion on Granville Street, the City of Vancouver opposed access ramps for Richmond traffic. Tom Siddon, member for Burnaby—Richmond—Delta, pressed for the ramps, which opened in 1986.

In 2006, YVR floated a proposal that the bridge be restricted to airport traffic, which provoked a hostile reaction from Richmond city councillors.

Further improvements

The exercise closed half the lanes for four months, and cost about $3m.

In the mid-1990s, the bridge underwent seismic upgrades, which comprised deficient bearings, piers and foundations, and potential soil liquefaction. The work included 800 stone columns installed along either side of the bridge for ground improvement. Richmond, about  metre above sea level, requires drainage and flood protection. To this end, Grauer Road was raised to 4.7m, which would handle a one-metre rise in sea level. At the road perimeter, the installation of a buried steel sheet pile wall will ensure the bridge piers remain flexible in a seismic event. The road base comprises pumice for light weight and drainage. The project was completed in 2014 for the opening of the McArthurGlen outlet mall.

In 2008, Translink added a bus lane on Russ Baker Way, between Gilbert Road and Cessna Drive. To respond to 127 crashes each year on the bridge, camera monitoring was added and 
a tow truck stationed at the south end of the bridge during morning rush hour. 

In 2014, the adjustment of vehicle lane widths allowed bike-lane widening to improve safety for cyclists.

Gliding above

In May 1981, a Cessna 172, that ran out of fuel, crash landed on the bridge deck, but caused no injuries.

Since completion of the north runway in 1996, primarily used for landings, signs have warned bridge traffic of low flying aircraft.

The Middle Arm SkyTrain Bridge, which opened in 2009, passes over the Arthur Laing southern approach.

See also
 List of crossings of the Fraser River
 List of BC bridges

Footnotes

References

Bridges in Greater Vancouver
Bridges completed in 1975
Transport in Richmond, British Columbia
Bridges over the Fraser River
Road bridges in British Columbia
1975 establishments in British Columbia
Sea Island (British Columbia)